Kethanahalli Saint Francis Xavier Church is a parish church for catholic devotees around Kethanahalli Village in Dharmapuri district, Tamil Nadu, India. This village is exactly locates near Hanumanthapuram Village in Karimangalam block.

History
Initially, some Catholic families from the Tirupathur-Koviloor parish brought land here and settled in Kethanahalli (Kethampatti). Later, Catholic families from Dharmapuri-Koviloor, Kottampatti, Poolapatti, and Savoor have settled here. In 1930, this place became a substation of Kadagathur St. Mary's Parish Church.

Sub Stations

Under this Kethanahalli Parish church there where 2 substation St. Mary Magdalene Chapel and St. Antony's Chapel which is located within  2 km radius. RC Fathima Primary School is run under the church Administration.

References

Roman Catholic churches in Tamil Nadu
Churches in Dharmapuri district